Gerard D'Amico is an American politician who served in the Massachusetts Senate from 1977 to 1987 and was a member of the Worcester, Massachusetts School Committee from 1972 to 1976. He was a candidate for Lieutenant Governor of Massachusetts in 1986. He lost to Evelyn Murphy in the Democratic primary.

References

1947 births
Boston University alumni
Harvard Kennedy School alumni
Massachusetts state senators
Politicians from Worcester, Massachusetts
Living people